"Kyrie" is a song by American pop rock band Mr. Mister, from their album Welcome to the Real World. Released around Christmas in 1985, it hit the top spot on the Billboard Hot 100 in March 1986, where it was number 1 for two weeks. It also hit the top spot on the Billboard Top Rock Tracks chart for one week. In the UK, the song peaked at number 11 in March 1986.

Background and writing 
The lyrics to "Kyrie" were written by Arizona-born John Lang who co-wrote the songs on all of Mr. Mister's albums. The music was composed by Richard Page and Steve George while on tour with Adam Ant.

Kýrie, eléison means "Lord, have mercy" in Greek, and is a part of many liturgical rites in Eastern and Western Christianity. Kýrie, eléison; Christé, eléison; Kýrie, eléison is a prayer that asks "Lord, have mercy; Christ, have mercy; Lord, have mercy." According to Page the entire song is, essentially, a prayer.

There is a myth that singer Richard Page wrote "Kyrie" while lying in a hospital bed following being assaulted. John Lang has stated that he was the one who was assaulted, three years before the composition, and that the incident has nothing to do with the song.

The video was directed by Nick Morris, and features the band in performance mixed with footage taken at the tail end of their Autumn 1985 tour with Tina Turner.

"Kyrie" was used in the hit U.S. TV series Miami Vice during season two, episode fourteen "One-Way Ticket". 
It was also used in the Netflix series' GLOW as well as the ABC sitcom The Goldbergs. The U.S. 7" single can be found pressed on transparent purple vinyl or polystyrene, depending on where it was manufactured.

Reception
Cash Box said it's a "booming track which...features top musicianship and a soaring chorus hook."

Track listing 
7" single

"Kyrie" (single edit) – 4:10
"Run to Her" – 3:36

12" single
"Kyrie" (album version) – 4:24
"Run to Her" – 3:36
"Hunters of the Night" – 5:07

The single edit (which was also used for the video version) ends with the a cappella phrase "Kýrie, eléison, down the road that I must travel", while the album version simply fades out.

Charts

Weekly charts

Year-end charts

All-time charts

Cover versions 

In 1993, Acappella Vocal Band, a traditional Southern gospel group, included a version of the song on their album U And Me And God Make 5 (Word).  The group later recorded a Spanish version of the song as well.  Also in 1993, the song, retitled as "Kyrie Eleison", was covered by Contemporary Christian music duo East to West on their self-titled debut album.

Contemporary Christian artist Mark Schultz recorded it for his 2001 album Song Cinema.

Notes 

1985 singles
1985 songs
Mr. Mister songs
Billboard Hot 100 number-one singles
Cashbox number-one singles
Number-one singles in Norway
RPM Top Singles number-one singles
Songs written by Steve George (keyboardist)
Songs written by Richard Page (musician)
RCA Records singles
Rock ballads